Aiman Muneeb  (née Khan ; born 20 November 1998) is a former Pakistani actress who appears in Urdu television. She made her acting debut in 2013 with ARY Digital's drama Meri Beti and appeared several serials. Khan get recognition after playing female protagonist Mashal in Khaali Haath and Shafaq in Ghar Titli Ka Par. She was last seen portraying Meeru in Hum TV's Baandi 2018.

She earned a nomination for Best Actress at Hum Awards for her work in Ishq Tamasha and Baandi both (2018).

Personal life
Khan was born on 20 November 1998 in Karachi, Sindh, one of a pair of twins, the other being her sister Minal Khan. She also has three brothers. Her father Mubeen Khan was a Police officer serving in Sindh Police while her mother Uzma Khan is a housewife. Khan's father died on 31 December 2020. She belongs to a Urdu-speaking Mohajir family.

Aiman Khan married Muneeb Butt in Karachi on 21 November 2018. The couple performed their first Umrah during Ramadan 2019. The couple had a daughter, Amal Muneeb in 2019. She became Pakistan's most followed celebrity on Instagram with 11.2 Million followers.

Career 
Aiman khan made her acting debut in 2012 with the drama 'Mohabbat Bhaar Mai Jaye', which aired on Hum TV.

Television

Telefilm and other appearance

Special appearances

Awards and nominations

References

External links 
 
 

21st-century Pakistani actresses
Living people
1998 births
Pakistani twins